Theatre Intime is an entirely student-run dramatic arts not-for-profit organization operating out of the Hamilton Murray Theater at Princeton University.  Intime receives no direct support from the university, and is entirely acted, produced, directed, teched and managed by a board of students that is elected once a semester. "Students manage every aspect of Theatre Intime, from choosing the plays to setting the ticket prices."

History
Theatre Intime was founded in 1920 by a group of Princeton undergraduates; in 1922 it took over the Hamilton Murray Theater as its stage. It has presented the American premieres of several plays by prominent creators, including Jean Cocteau's The Typewriter and  W. H. Auden's Age of Anxiety. Members of the troupe have included Jimmy Stewart, Joshua Logan, Larry Strichman, William Hootkins, John C. Vennema, Roger Berlind, Mark Feuerstein, Charles Scribner, Clark Gesner, Richard Greenberg, Winnie Holzman, Mark Nelson, and Wentworth Miller.

In the late 1920s, the group spawned a summer theater project, the University Players, whose early members included Stewart, Logan, and Henry Fonda.  Later, a semi-professional summer company was founded by Charles Bernstein, class of 1967, and Jon Lorrain and Geoff Peterson, class of 1969. It was called 'Summer Intime.' In its first season the company produced The Night of the Iguana, Amphitryon 38, The Trial and Arms and the Man. It paid salaries to its acting company by selling subscriptions to the Princeton community. Some years later the name of the summer company was changed to Princeton Summer Theater.

In November 2022, Theatre Intime celebrated its centennial after delays due to the COVID-19 pandemic.

Board
The Intime board is composed entirely of current undergraduates. It is divided into two levels, the Managing Board, which includes roles such as Costumes Manager and House Manager and is elected every semester, and the Executive Board, which is headed by the General Manager and Production Manager and is elected once a year at the beginning of the spring term. The board is responsible for the maintenance and running of the theater as well as choosing the season every year from a list of submitted proposals.

Seasons

Current season
2022-2023
Celebration and Party Time by Harold Pinter
Twelfth Night by William Shakespeare
Autumn Rewind by Le'Naya Wilkerson '25
Torch Song by Harvey Fierstein

Past seasons
2021-2022
Sniper by Bonnie Culver
Much Ado About Nothing by William Shakespeare
A Doll's House by Henrik Ibsen
The Laramie Project by Moises Kaufman
Shrek the Musical by Jeanine Tesori and David Lindsay-Abaire
2020-2021

The 2020-2021 season was interrupted by the COVID-19 pandemic. The Mainstage season was supplemented by a number of original festivals.

 As You Like It by William Shakespeare

2019-2020
Eurydice by Sarah Ruhl
Measure for Measure by William Shakespeare
Antigonick by Anne Carson
Vanya and Sonia and Masha and Spike by Christopher Durang
Sweeney Todd by Stephen Sondheim (music and lyrics) and Hugh Wheeler (book)

2018-2019

 The Moors by Jen Silverman
Iphigenia at Aulis by Euripides
Iphigenia and Other Daughters by Ellen McLaughlin
 The Luck of the Irish by Kirsten Greenidge
 Cowboy vs. Samurai by Michael Golamco
Richard III by William Shakespeare
Seascape by Edward Albee

2017-2018

The Flick by Annie Baker
 Arcadia by Tom Stoppard
She Kills Monsters by Qui Nguyen
Stop Kiss by Diana Son
A Funny Thing Happened on the Way to the Forum by Stephen Sondheim (lyrics), Burt Shevelove (book), and Larry Gelbart (music)

2016-2017
 Blue Heart by Caryl Churchill
 California Suite by Neil Simon
 Speech & Debate by Stephen Karam
 Agamemnon by Aeschylus
 Mud by Maria Irene Fornes

2015-2016
 Gidion's Knot by Johnna Adams
 Bengal Tiger at the Baghdad Zoo by Rajiv Joseph
 When Dawn Breaks (an adaptation of One Thousand and One Nights) by Nico Krell '18
 Harvey by Mary Chase
 Oleanna by David Mamet

2014-2015
 Red by John Logan
 Romeo and Juliet by William Shakespeare
 The Little Dog Laughed by Douglas Carter Beane
 La Cage aux Folles by Harvey Fierstein (book) and Jerry Herman (music and lyrics)
 How the Other Half Loves by Alan Ayckbourn

2013-2014
 Fuddy Meers by David Lindsay-Abaire
 All My Sons by Arthur Miller
 Frankenstein by Robert Sandberg
 The Language Archive by Julia Cho
 Venus in Fur by David Ives
 The Drowsy Chaperone by Bob Martin and Don McKellar (book), Lisa Lambert and Greg Morrison (music and lyrics)
 Everything In Isolation by Ava Geyer '15

2012-2013
 Gruesome Playground Injuries by Rajiv Joseph
 Wait Until Dark by Frederick Knott
 Sight Unseen (play) by Donald Margulies
 The Baltimore Waltz by Paula Vogel
 Circle Mirror Transformation by Annie Baker
 Sexy Imaginary Friend by Mark Watter '14
 June Groom by Rick Abbot

2011-2012
 Lost in Yonkers by Neil Simon
 Rock 'n' Roll by Tom Stoppard
 The Pavilion by Craig Wright
 Dead Man's Cell Phone by Sarah Ruhl
 Private Lives by Noël Coward
 Admissions by Clayton Raithel, Dan Abromowitz, and Nora Sullivan
 7 Stories by Morris Panych

2010-2011
 Red Herring by Michael Hollinger
 This Is Our Youth by Kenneth Lonergan
 Garden District by Tennessee Williams
 Recent Tragic Events by Craig Wright
 Brighton Beach Memoirs by Neil Simon
 The Elephant Man by Bernard Pomerance
 Amateurs by Tom Griffin

2009-2010
 Proof by David Auburn
 Venting by Mara Nelson-Greenberg
 Crime and Punishment by Marilyn Campbell and Curt Columbus
 The Tempest by William Shakespeare
 Copenhagen by Michael Frayn
 Reefer Madness by Kevin Murphy (books and lyrics) and Dan Studney (music)
 Catch Me If You Can by Jack Weinstock and Willie Gilbert

2008-2009
 Crimes of the Heart by Beth Henley
 Some Things You Need to Know Before the World Ends by Larry Larson and Levi Lee
 Boy Gets Girl by Rebecca Gilman
 Metamorphoses by Mary Zimmerman
 King Lear by William Shakespeare
 Hey Boy Wonder! The Other Adventures of Ultraman by Shawn Fennell
 Our Town by Thornton Wilder

2007-2008
 The Violet Hour by Richard Greenberg
 Topdog/Underdog by Suzan-Lori Parks
 The Skin of Our Teeth by Thornton Wilder
 Macbeth by William Shakespeare
 The Pillowman by Martin McDonagh
 Arabian Nights by Mary Zimmerman
 The Foreigner by Larry Shue

2006-2007
 Boston Marriage by David Mamet
 Cuchulain Comforted by W.B. Yeats
 Equus by Peter Schaffer
 Terra Nova by Ted Talley
 Valentine at Bellevue by Joshua Williams
 Under Milk Wood by Dylan Thomas
 Glengarry Glenn Ross by David Mamet

2005-2006
 Buried Child by Sam Shepard
 Too Much Light Makes the Baby Go Blind by The Neo-Futurists
 Wonderland Salvage by Joshua Williams
 Fences by August Wilson
 The Goat, or Who Is Sylvia? by Edward Albee
 College: The Musical by Scott Elmegreen and Drew Fornarola
 All My Sons by Arthur Miller

2004-2005
 Fair Game by Karl Gajdusek
 Rumors by Neil Simon
 The Real Thing by Tom Stoppard
 A Chorus Line by James Kirkwood & Nicholas Dante (book), Marvin Hamlisch (music), Edward Kleban (lyrics)
 Cymbeline by William Shakespeare
 The Bald Soprano and The Chairs by Eugène Ionesco
 Hannah and Martin by Kate Fodor

2003-2004
 Hysteria by Terry Johnson
 The Laramie Project by Moisés Kaufman and the Tectonic Theater Project
 No Exit by Jean-Paul Sartre
 The Clouds by Aristophanes
 The Trestle at Pope Lick Creek by Naomi Wallace
 Cabaret by John Kander (music), Fred Ebb (lyrics), and Joe Masteroff (book)
 The Master and Margarita adapted by Peter Morris

2002-2003
 Betty's Summer Vacation by Christopher Durang
 Men Without Shadows by Jean-Paul Sartre
 The Hothouse by Harold Pinter
 Six Degrees of Separation by John Guare
 The Water Engine by David Mamet
 Bums and Monkeys by David Brundige
 The Fix by John Depsey (book) and Dana P. Rowe (music)

2001-2002
 The Effect of Gamma Rays on Man-in-the-Moon Marigolds by Paul Zindel
 The Real Inspector Hound by Tom Stoppard
 The Shadow Box by Michael Christopher
 Man of La Mancha by Dale Wasserman (book), Joe Darion (lyrics), and Mitch Leigh (music)
 The American Dream and The Zoo Story by Edward Albee
 Stop Kiss by Diana Son
 Rhinoceros by Eugene Ionescu
 Student Playwrights Festival
 Plaza Suite by Neil Simon

2000-2001
 Noises Off by Michael Frayn
 Who's Afraid of Virginia Woolf? by Edward Albee
 Hedda Gabler by Henrik Ibsen
 Death and the Maiden by Ariel Dorfman
 Picasso at the Lapin Agile by Steve Martin
 The House of Yes by Wendy MacLeod
 Macbeth by William Shakespeare

1999-2000
 Rosencrantz and Guildenstern are Dead by Tom Stoppard
 Educating Rita by Willy Russell
 Mad Forest by Caryl Churchill
 Jeffrey by Paul Rudnick
 Assassins by Stephen Sondheim (music, lyrics) and John Weidman (book)
 J.B. by Archibald MacLeish
 Beyond Therapy by Christopher Durang
 Student Playwrights Festival

1998-1999
 I Hate Hamlet by Paul Rudnick
 Arms and the Man by George Bernard Shaw
 Tartuffe by Molière
 Extremities by William Mastrosimone
 The Mousetrap by Agatha Christie
 The Colored Museum by George C. Wolfe
 Arcadia by Tom Stoppard
 Student Playwrights Festival

1997-1998
 Brighton Beach Memoirs by Neil Simon
 The Glass Menagerie by Tennessee Williams
 Oh Dad, Poor Dad, Mamma's Hung You in the Closet and I'm Feelin' So Sad by Arthur Kopit
 Company by Stephen Sondheim
 Hay Fever by Noel Coward
 FOB (play) by David Henry Hwang
 Student Playwrights Festival

1996-1997
 An Actors Nightmare and Sister Mary Ignatious Explains It All for You, by Christopher Durang
 Pippin by Stephen Schwartz (music, lyrics) and Roger o. Hirson (book)
 Guest Production: Murder, Mystery, Mayhem, by Marvin Cheiten '65, directed by Dan Berkowitz '70
 Keely and Du by Jane Martin
 Crimes of the Heart by Beth Henley
 All in the Timing by David Ives
 A Few Good Men by Aaron Sorkin
 The Importance of Being Earnest by Oscar Wilde

1995-1996
 Six Degrees of Separation by John Guare
 Gatsby, adapted and directed by Erik Brodnax '96 from the novel
 Burn This by Lanford Wilson, directed by Suzanne Agins '97
 The Bacchae by Euripides
 Dime Store Zen, organized by Joseph Hernandez-Kolski
 Bent by Martin Sherman
 Daughters of Survival, 50 year memorial of female experience in Auschwitz, written and directed by Jennifer Huang '97
 True West by Sam Shepherd
 Student Playwrights Festival

1994-1995
 Lips Together, Teeth Apart by Terrence McNally
 Sexual Peversity in Chicago by David Mamet
 Ducks by David Mamet
 Across Jordan by Merle Field and Margaret Pine: Guest Production and World Premiere
 Les Liaisons Dangereuses by Christopher Hampton
 The Marriage of Bette and Boo by Christopher Durang
 Grotesque Lovesongs by Don Nigro
 Rosencrantz and Guildenstern Are Dead by Tom Stoppard
 Our Country's Good by Timberlake Wertenbaker
 Dime Store Zen, a festival of scenes, dances and monologues organized by Kiersten Van Horne '95
 The Maids by Jean Genet
 Student Playwrights Festival

1993-1994
 Vampire Lesbians of Sodom by Charles Busch
 The Shadow Box by Michael Christopher
 Hamlet by Pirandello
 Buried Child by Sam Shepherd
 The Tempest
 Steel Magnolias by Robert Harling
 Student Plays
 Great Tuna by Gaston, Sears and Howard

1992-1993
 Little Footsteps by Ted Tally
 Master Harold and the Boys by Atho Fugard
 The Importance of Being Earnest by Oscar Wilde
 The House of Blue Leaves by John Guare
 Noises Off by Michael Frayn
 Another Antigone by A.R. Gurney
 Suddenly Last Summer by Tennessee Williams
 Solitary Confinement by Jeff Gothard '95

1991-1992
 Here Lies Jeremy Troy by Jack Sharkey
 Drinking in America by Eric Bogosian
 The Foreigner by Larry Shue
 Deathtrap by Ira Levin
 As You Like It
 The Gospel of Luke by Bruce Kuhn
 The Rehearsal by Jean Anouilh
 Find Me by Olwen Wynmark
 Cyrano de Bergerac by Edmond Rostand
 The Cherry Orchard
 Student plays

1990-1991
 White Stones by Bill Boesky '88
 Laundry and Bourbon by James McLure
 Talk Radio by Eric Bogosain
 Hurlyburly by David Rabe
 Rhinoceros by Ionesco
 Amadeus by Peter Schaffer
 Waiting for Godot by Samuel Beckett
 Student Plays
 Biloxi Blues by Neil Simon

1989-1990
 Luv by Murray Schisgal
 No Exit by Jean-Paul Sartre
 Uncommon Women by Wendy Wasserstein
 A Lesson from Aloes by Athol Fugard
 Burn This by Lanford Wilson
 Orphans by Lyle Kessler
 Fool For Love by Sam Shepard
 Student Plays
 Dusa, Fish, Stas and Vi

1988-1989
 Brilliant Traces by Cindy Lou Johnson
 Sister Mary Ignatius Explains Its All For You by Christopher Durang
 Benefactors by Michael Frayn
 In the Jungle of the Cities by Bertolt Brecht
 Hair by Geronme Ragnim James Rando and Galt MacDermot
 Blood Relations by Sharon Pollock
 Old Times by Harold Pinter
 Student Plays
 The Day Room by Don Delilo

1987-1988
 Private Scenes
 Play/ Come and Go/ What, Where, by Samuel Beckett, directed by Elizabeth Quainton '89 and Colgate grad Russel Reich
 Equus by Peter Schaffer
 The Promise by Alexei Arbuzov
 The Prisoner of Second Avenue by Neil Simon
 The Serpent by Jean Claude van Itallie
 Aunt Dan and Lemon by Wallace Shawn
 Student Plays
 Mousetrap by Agatha Christie

1986-1987
 Condemned by Tennessee Williams
 Alternative Voices in American Theater, led by Kevin Teal and Ilze Thielman
 The Dutchman and The Sound of a Voice by David Hwang
 Happy Birthday Wanda June by Kurt Vonnegut
 The Real Thing by Tom Stoppard
 Crimes of the Heart by Beth Henley
 Extremities by William Mastrosimone
 The Time by Paul Schiff Berman '88

1985-1986
 Home Free by Lanford Wilson
 The Maids by Jean Genet
 Shivaree by William Mastrosimone
 Blue Window by Craig Lucas
 Twelfth Night
 Dracula
 Agnes of God by John Pielmeier
 Of Mice and Men by John Steinbeck

1984-1985
 Lone Star by Kevin Groome '85
 A Night Out by Harold Pinter
 Performing by Michael Kaplan '85
 The Diviners by Jim Leonard
 The Lion in Winter by James Goldman
 Rosencrantz and Guildenstern are Dead by Tom Stoppard
 Who's Afraid of Virginia Woolf by Edward Albee
 Sexual Perversity in Chicago
 Suddenly Last Summer by Tennessee Williams
 Julius Caesar

1983-1984
 The American Dream by Edward Albee
 Silence by Harold Pinter
 Miss Julie by Strindberg
 The House of Blue Leaves by John Guare
 Curiculo by Plautus
 Pippin by Roger O. Hirson and Stephen Schwartz
 The Cocktail Party by T.S. Eliot
 Nuts by Tom Topor
 Dead Give-Away by Michael Rosenfeld '84, directed by Veronica Brady
 Feiffer's People by Jules Feiffer

1982-1983
 Jack, or The Submission by Ionesco
 The Bear by Anton Chekhov
 On the Harmfulness of Tobacco by Anton Chekhov
 A Marriage Proposal by Anton Chekhov
 As You Like It
 They Are Dying Out by Peter Handke
 Adaptation by Elaine May
 Plants and Waiters by William Anastasi
 Brussels by Jacques Brel
 The Rimers of Eldritch by Lanford Wilson
 Born Yesterday by Garson Kanvin
 A Soldier's Tale by Igor Stravinsky
 The Odd Couple by Neil Simon

1981-1982
 Feiffer's People by Jules Feiffer
 The Loveliest Afternoon of the Year by John Guare
 The Dumwaiter by Harold Pinter
 Camino Real by Tennessee Williams
 Misanthrope by Molière
 Godspell by Stephen Schwartz
 Black Comedy by Peter Schaffer
 Lysistrata by Aristophanes
 Stage Directions by Israel Horowitz
 Aria de Capo by Edna St. Vincent Millay
 Scenes from American Life by A.R. Gurney

1980-1981
 The Birdbath by Leonard Malfi
 No Exit by Jean-Paul Sartre
 The Lesson by Eugène Ionesco
 The Importance of Being Earnest by Oscar Wilde
 The Fifth Column by Ernest Hemingway
 Harvey by Mary Chase
 Man is Man by Bertolt Brecht
 The Impresario by Gian Lorenzo Bernini
 Lovers by Brian Friel
 The Zoo Story by Edward Albee
 A Child's Guide to American History
 One woman show based on the life of Edna St. Vincint Millay, by Kelly Easterling '81

1979-1980
 A Jaques Brel by Jaques Brel
 Welcome to Andromeda by Ron Whyte
 Home Free by Lanford Wilson
 The Birthday Party by Harold Pinter
 The Norman Conquests by Alan Ayckbourn
 Hedda Gabler by Henrik Ibsen
 A Day in the Death of Joe Egg by Peter Nichols
 Antigone by Jean Anouilh
 MIT Shakespeare Ensemble in Residence, performing The Winter's Tale

1978-1979
 Anatol by Arthur Schnitxler
 Romeo and Juliet
 The Typists by Murray Schisgal
 27 Wagons of Cotton, by Tennessee Williams
 On the Harmfulness of Tobacco by Chekhov
 Patience by Gilbert and Sullivan
 Aeneas in Flames by Billy Aronson '79, directed by Carol Elliott
 The Children's Hour by Lillian Hellman
 Troilus and Cressida
 MIT Shakespeare Ensemble in Residence.

1977-1978
 The Tiger
 Anyone Can Whistle by Stephen Sondheim, directed by Geoff Rich '78
 When You Comin' Back Red Ryder? by Mark Medoff
 House of Blue Leaves by John Guare
 On the Harmfulness of Tobacco by Chekhov
 The Bear by Chekhov
 The Chorus Girl by Chekhov
 This Property is Condemned by Tennessee Williams
 Talk to Me Like the Rain and Let me Listen by Tennessee Williams
 Loot by Joe Orten

1976-1977
 How He Lied to Her Husband by George Bernard Shaw
 Old Times by Harold Pinter
 The Tempest
 Don Juan by Molière
 Sea Fantasy by Billy Aronson
 Tonight at 8.30 by Noël Coward
 The Vise by Pirandello
 The Birdbath by Leonard Malfi
 Ring Around the Moon by Jean Anouilh, directed by Geoff Rich '78
 Endgame by Samuel Beckett

1975-1976
 The Golden Fleece by A.R. Gurney
 The Public Eye by Peter Schaffer, director Kate Stewart '77
 The Private Ear by Peter Schaffer, director by Mitchell Ivers '77
 All's Well That Ends Well
 Lysistrata by Aristophanes
 We're on the One Road
 The Marriage of Bette and Boo by Christopher Durang

1974-1975
 The Typists by Murray Schisgal
 The Effect of Gamma Rays on Man-in-the-Moon-Marigolds by Paul Zindel
 The Real Inspector Hound by Tom Stoppard
 After Magritte by Tom Stoppard
 Lovers by Brian Friel
 Ubu Cuckold by Alfred Jarry
 The Puppet Show by Alexander Blok
 The Caucasian Chalk Circle by Bertolt Brecht
 The Glass Menagerie by Tennessee Williams

1973-1974
 The Lover by Harold Pinter
 Adaptation by Elaine Mat
 Next by Terrence McNally
 Balls by Paul Foster
 The Successful Life of 3 by Maria Irene Fornes
 Measure for Measure
 Slow Dance on the Killing Ground by William Hanley
 The American Dream by Edward Albee
 The Sandbox by Edward Albee
 Citizen Kong
 'Tis Pity She's a Whore by John Ford

1972-1973
 The Hundred and First by Kenneth Carmon
 As you Like It
 Electra by Euripides
 Ten Little Indians by Agatha Christie
 Squanto by Jim Magnuson, directed by Professor Robert Knapp
 Hay Fever by Noël Coward

1971-1972
 Dracula adapted from Tod Browning's film by Daniel Blackmon '73 and William Bowman '74
 Frogs! by Aristotle
 Phaedra by Racine
 The two Executioners by Arrabal
 The Hostage by Brendan Behan
 Woyzeck by Georg Buchner
 The Philanderer by George Bernard Shaw

1970-1971
 Zoo Story by Edward Albee
 Swan Song by Chekhov
 Three Penny Opera by Brecht
 The Physicists by Friedrich Dürrenmatt
 Endgame by Samuel Beckett
 Henry IV Part I
 Beyond the Fringe

1969-1970
 The Red Eye of Love by Arnold Weinstein
 A Man for All Seasons by Robert Bolt
 The Happy time by Samuel Taylor
 Marat/Sade

1968-1969
 The Dumbwaiter by Harold Pinter
 The Lesson by Eugène Ionesco
 The Clouds by Aristophanes
 The Killer by Eugène Ionesco, Directed by Professor Frederic O'Brady
 The World of Carl Sandburg
 Long Day's Journey Into Night by Eugene O'Neill
 Slow Dance on the Killing Ground, by William Hanley, directed by Professor Robert Knapp
 The Alchemist by Ben Jonson
 An Irish Faustus by Lawrence Durrell, directed by Dan Berkowitz '70
 Moby Dick Rehearsed by Orson Welles
 The Knack by Ann Jellicoe
 The Madness of Lady Bright by Lanford Wilson

1967-1968
 Under Milk Wood by Dylan Thomas
 The Balcony by Jean Genet
 Incident at Vichy by Arthur Miller
 The Misanthrope by Molier, Directed by Professor Frederic O'Brady
 The Dumbwaiter by Harold Pinter
 Hamlet
 Luv by Murray Schisgal
 Once Upon a Mattress by Jay Thompson, Marshall Baker and Dean Fuller
 Miracle by Max Kerpelman and Barry Miles, directed by Geoff Peterson '69

1965-1966
 Th White Devil by John Webster
 Sophocles' King Oedipus by W.B. Yeats
 The Bespoke Overcoat by Wolf Mankowitz
 You Can't Take It with You, by George Kaufman and Moss Hart
 Little Mary Sunshine by Rick Besoyan
 The Caretaker by Harold Pinter
 The Taming of the Shrew
 Those that I Fight by Joanna Russ
 The Cat and the Canary by John Willard, directed by Geoff Peterson '69
 Cat on a Hot Tin Roof by Tennessee Williams
 Thurber Carnival by James Thurber
 The Romanticks (Les Romanesques), Edmond Rostand

1964-1965
 Inherit the Wind by Lawrence and Robert Lee
 Passion, Poison, and Petrification by George Bernard Shaw
 Mister Roberts by Joshua Logan, Princeton '31 and Thomas Heggen
 Escurial by Michel de Gheldore
 The Dumbwaiter by Harold Pinter
 A Man's a Man by Bertolt Brecht

1963-1964
 The Potholder by Alice Gerstenberg
 The Skin of Our Teeth
 Kind Lady by Edward Choderate
 Zoo Story by Edward Albee
 The American Dream by Edward Albee
 Billy Budd by Herman Melville

1962-1963
 Hello Out There by William Saroyan
 Bedtime Story by Sean O'Casey
 A Streetcar Named Desire by Tennessee Williams
 The Devil's Disciple by George Bernard Shaw

1961-1962
 The Fisherman by Jonthon Tree
 Passion, Poison, and Petrification by George Bernard Shaw
 Charley's Aunt by Brandon Thomas
 Henry IV by Pirandello
 Look Back in Anger by John Osbourne
 Calvary by W.B. Yeats
 A Night of the Trojan War by John Drinkwater
 Passion, Poison and Petrification

1960-1961
 Purgatory by W.B. Yeats
 Professor Taranna by Arthur Adamov
 Recollections by Arthur Adamov
 The Jew of Malta by Christopher Marlowe
 Woyzeck by Georg Buchner
 Twenty-Seven Wagons Full of Cotton by Tennessee Williams
 The Purification by Tennessee Williams
 La Ronde by Arthur Schnitzler

1958-1959
 A Masque of Reason by Robert Frost
 World Without End
 Beyond the Horizon by Eugene O'Neill
 The Revenger's Tragedy by Cyril Trourneur
 Ondine by Jean Giraudoux
 Student Plays

1957-1958
 Hello OutThere by William Saroyan
 Sweeney Agonistes by T.S. Eliot
 The Rainmaker by Richard Nash
 The Alchemist by Ben Jonson
 The Glass Menagerie by Tennessee Williams
 Mother Loves me: A Freudian Fable by Clark Gesner, class '60, author of You're a Good Man, Charlie Brown

1956-1957
 Alcestis by Euripides
 Androcles and the Lion by George Bernard Shaw
 Measure for Measure
 Bound East for Cardiff by eugene O'Neil
 Student Plays
 The Caine Mutiny by Herman Wouk

1955-1956
 Liliom by Feremc Molnar
 Clash by Night by Clifford Odets
 Student Plays
 The Braggart Warrior by Plautus

1954-1955
 Murder in the Cathedral
 The Victors by Jean-Paul Sartre
 The Knight of the Burning Pestle by William Congreve
 Student Plays
 Love for Love by William Congreve

1953-1954
 An Evening of Readings
 Arms and the Man by George Bernard Shaw
 Henry IV, Part I
 Student Plays
 Tartuffe by Molière

1952-1953
 Antigone by Jean Anouilth
 Othello
 The White Rooster, film adapted by Charles Robinson '54
 Student Plays
 The Drunkard by Anonymous

1951-1952
 The Trojan War Will Not Take Place by Jean Giraudoux
 Student Plays, including A Modern Romance by Edwin Conquest, directed by Roger Berlind Princeton, '52
 The Searching Sun by John O'Hara

1950-1951
 The Importance of Being Earnest by Oscar Wilde
 The Petrified Forest by Robert Sherwood
 Henry IV
 Volpone by Ben Jonson
 Student Plays

1949-1950
 The School for Scandal by Sheridan
 The Typewriter by Jean Cocteau
 King Lear
 Student Plays
 Captain Brassbound's Conversion by George Bernard Shaw

1948-1949
 Yes Is for a Very Young Man by Gertrude Stein
 The Cenci by Percy Shelly
 A Christmas Carol
 Heartbreak House by George Bernard Shaw
 Student Plays
 Boy Meets Girl by Bella dn Samuel Spewack

1947-1948
 High Tor by Maxwell Anderson
 The Imaginary Invalid by Molière
 Richard II
 One on the House

1946-1947
 Blithe Spirit by Noël Coward
 The Critic by Sheridan
 The Scheming Lieutenant by Sheridan
 Twilight Bar
 Make Mine Sherry

1945-1946
 Break the Ice

1941-1942
 Jim Dandy by William Saroyan
 Three White Leopards
 Gabbatha
 Give the Earth a Little Longer by Jules Romains
 Come What April

1940-1941
 Our Boys by Bryon
 Troilus and Cressida
 Time of Their Lives by Robert Nail, Princeton '33
 The Lawyer by Ferenc Molnár
 Raise your Six

1928-1929
 Much Ado About Nothing
 Crocadiles Are Happy
 Tsar Fyodor Ivanovitch by Alexei Tolstoy
 The Torchbearers by George Kelly
 The Old Timer by Charles Mather

1927-1928
 Caesar and Cleopatra by George Bernard Shaw
 Open Collars by Erik Barnouw '29
 The Wild Duck by Henrik Ibsen
 The Truth About Blayds by A.A. Milne
 The Devil's Disciple by George Bernard Shaw

1926-1927
 Doctor Faustus by Christopher Marlowe
 Student Plays
 Saint Joan by George Bernard Shaw
 Outward Bound by Sutton Vane
 Hamlet[13][14]

1925-1926
 Where the Cross is Made by Eugene O'Neill
 Wurzel-Flummery by A.A. Milne
 The Proposal by Chekhov
 Two Crooks and a Lady by Eugene Pillot
 A Good Woman by Arnold Bennett
 Candida by George Bernard Shaw
 The Green Goddess by William Archer

1919-1920
 Le Ballet Intime
 Ghost by Ibsen (last act)
 Macbeth
 Hamlet
 The Glittering Gate by Lord Dunsany
 Fame and the Poet by Lord Dunsany
 Swine by Lewis Laflin '26
 A Game of Chess by Kenneth Sawyer Goodman
 Sampson and Delilah by Ralph Kent '21 and Reginald Lawrence '21
 Interlude by A. Hyatt Mayor '22
 Isle of Paradise by Henry Hart '23 and Louis Laflin '26
 The Caine Mutiny by Herman Wouk

References

Sources
 Dorgers, Edward (1950) A History of Dramatic Production in Princeton NJ. New York University: NLB
 Princeton University. "Theatre Intime Facility To Be Renovated." 2000, https://pr.princeton.edu/news/00/q2/0427-intime.htm. Accessed 7 Mar 2019.

External links
Theatre Intime - Official website
Princeton University Theater - Lewis Center for the Arts
Theatre~Intime Records 1919-2011 at Seeley G. Mudd Manuscript Library
Princeton News - Theatre Intime facility to be renovated
Curtain will rise in fall on newly renovated Theatre-Intime
Princeton University - Drawings unveiled for new theater at McCarter
From Princeton to Primetime, 'Prison Break' star Wentworth Miller '95 remembers his time on campus- The Daily Princetonian
Princeton Summer Theater- Official Website



Princeton University